Black-backed gull may refer to:

 Kelp gull (Larus dominicanus), of the southern hemisphere, also known as the southern black-backed gull
 Lesser black-backed gull (Larus fuscus), of the northern Atlantic
 Great black-backed gull (Larus marinus), of the northern Atlantic